The discography of American rock band Life of Agony includes six studio albums, thee compilation albums, three live albums, one video album, ten singles, four demos and ten music videos.

Albums

Studio albums

Compilation albums

Live albums

Demo albums

Singles

Music videos 
 "Through and Through"
 "This Time"
 "Weeds"
 "Desire" 
 "Love to Let You Down"
 "World Gone Mad"
 "Dead Speak Kindly"
 "Scars"
 "Lay Down"
 "Black Heart"
 "Stone" (lyric video)

References 

Discographies of American artists